Early entry may refer to:

NBA early entry, applying early for the National Basketball Association draft
NFL early entry, applying early for the National Football League draft